Crystal Hill is a hamlet in Terrell Rural Municipality No. 101 in the province of Saskatchewan, Canada. The hamlet is located 21 km east of Highway 36 on Highway 713. Very little remains of Crystal Hill.

See also

 List of communities in Saskatchewan
 List of hamlets in Saskatchewan

References

Terrell No. 101, Saskatchewan
Unincorporated communities in Saskatchewan
Division No. 3, Saskatchewan